Padayappa is a 1999 Indian Tamil-language masala film written and directed by K. S. Ravikumar. It stars Sivaji Ganesan, Rajinikanth, Ramya Krishnan and Soundarya with Abbas, Lakshmi, Radha Ravi and Nassar playing supporting roles. The soundtrack album and background score were composed by A. R. Rahman. The plot revolves around the titular character, Aarupadayappan, and his family being targeted in a generations-long revenge by his cousin Neelambari, a vamp who was left humiliated after Padayappa rejected her love proposal and instead fell in love with her timid, good-natured house maid Vasundhara.

Principal photography for the film began in October 1998. Padayappa was released on 10 April 1999 on the eve of Tamil New Year's Day. This was the first Tamil film to be released worldwide with 210 prints and 700,000 audio cassettes. It became Tamil cinema's highest-grossing film at that point. Ramya Krishnan's performance was praised, winning her a Filmfare Award under the Best Actress category. The film also won five Tamil Nadu State Film Awards.

Plot 
Padayappa is a mechanical engineer who returns to his village near Tanjore after three years of work in Madras to attend his sister's engagement. His sister is engaged to Suryaprakash, the son of their maternal uncle. During his stay, he comes across Vasundhara and falls in love with her. However, her shyness and fear of Neelambari, her landlady, prevents Vasundhara from initially expressing her feelings. In addition, Neelambari is Suryaprakash's sister, who had recently returned from abroad after studies, and she falls madly in love with Padayappa due to his charm, strength and bravery.

In a turn of events, Padayappa's father's brother Mani demands a share in the family property. Padayappa's father, the chieftain of the village, follows the customs of his forefathers by giving grand donations to all wedding of the village, under the stipulation that they must happen under consent of both bride and groom, and only under the eyes of the Chieftain in front of the Murugan temple. Out of anger, he reveals that Mani was the son of their dad's mistress, and his mother was compelled to raise him as their own. He refuses to divide the property and instead gives the entire property to Mani. This makes Padayappa's family to sign over the entire wealth and to leave their home the same evening. Mere steps out of their home, unable to bear the shock, Padayappa's father passes away. Padayppa's family moves to a vacant land on the outskirts of the village, which was purchased with the money saved from Padayappa's engineer work. Within days, Suryaprakash marries the daughter of Mani without the village's knowledge, albeit support from both his dad and Mani. Though shocked by this betrayal from her own brother, Padayappa's mother blesses the couple and returns.

Meanwhile, Padayappa sets to clean his land for agriculture. Mani's spy from there gives small rocks from that plot to Mani, who discovers that a hill on that property is solid granite, which will propel Padayppa to even greater wealth. He makes a drama claiming that the ghost of his brother has taught him a lesson, and makes a deal to exchange the entire ancestral wealth for the empty land. Padayappa's mother agrees with this, but after several misfortunate incidents, cancels the deal in Mani's home. Mani reveals the reason for the deal, and forces them to go ahead. Padayappa bashes Mani and his men, and leaves. Padayappa starts the granite business from which he becomes extremely rich. He uses the money to help the poor in his village, and provide them jobs. As his business flourishes, his family is able to once again settle down within months in a palatial residence. Padayappa assumes his father's position as village chieftain, and his sister marries one of the chief engineers who work in his company.

A year later, Neelambari learns about Padayappa's love for Vasundhara and she becomes jealous of her, and tries to harm herself. Her parents beg Padayappa's widowed mother to allow Neelambari to marry him. However, to everyone's surprise, Padayappa's mother proposes marriage for Padayappa and Vasundhara to Vasundhara's mother, her brother's servant and embarrasses Suryaprakash and his father in front of the entire village. This was in retaliation for Suryaprakash's humiliation of her after Padayappa's father death. Not able to bear the humiliation, Neelambari's father commits suicide the same night. When Neelambari tries to kill Vasundhara by letting a bull loose on her after giving her a red sari, Padayappa saves her, by pouring turmeric water on her sari, after which the two marry. Subsequent to the wedding, Neelambari locks herself in a room in Suryaprakash's house, watching and re-watching Padayappa's wedding on  video record, thinking of harming Vasundhara about Padayappa for 18 years.

Padayappa helps his father's foster brother, who has fallen on hard financial times. As a result, Padayappa's father's foster brother becomes indebted to him and seeks Padayappa's pardon for his misdeeds. Padayappa forgives him.

Neelambari plans her revenge on Padayappa, now a father of two daughters. Suryaprakash also has a son, Chandraprakash aka Chandru, who studies at the same college as Padayappa's elder daughter, Anitha. Neelambari advises Chandru to make Anitha fall in love with him. At the same time, Padayappa plans to get Anitha married to his sister's son. Neelambari, having made Chandru pretend to fall in love with Anitha, plans to humiliate Padayappa by making Anitha say that she does not wish to marry a groom of her parents' choice, and that she is in love with someone else. At the marriage ceremony, after Anitha does what Neelambari told her to do, Padayappa then makes an oath to unite Anitha with her lover by the next Muhurta day. Padayappa discovers that Chandru really did fall in love with Anitha, even though he was only initially pretending to do so on Neelambari's orders. When Padayappa takes Chandru and Anitha to the temple to get married, Neelambari and Suryaprakash give chase to stop them. During the chase, Suryaprakash is killed in a car accident.

Armed with a machine gun, Neelambari reaches the temple where Chandru and Anitha are married, and tries to kill Padayappa. Instead, Padayappa saves her life by preventing a bull from attacking her, while at the same time dodging the bullets she fires at him. Rather than live with the humiliation of knowing she was unsuccessful in avenging her father's death, as well as having her life saved by her enemy, Neelambari commits suicide, promising to take revenge on Padayappa in her next birth. Padayappa prays for her soul to be at peace and eventually attain salvation.

Cast

Production

Development 
In September 1998, Rajinikanth announced his next project, titled Padayappa, with K. S. Ravikumar as director. It also marks Ravikumar’s second collaboration with Rajinikanth after Muthu. The story of this film was taken in part from the historical Tamil novel, Ponniyin Selvan, by Kalki Krishnamurthy. Ravikumar had simultaneously discussed another script with Rajinikanth titled Hara, but the actor preferred to do Padayappa first. The title Padayappa is an adoption of Aarupadayappa  a sobriquet for Murugan and his six abodes. The film was produced by K. Sathya Narayana, M. V. Krishna Rao, and H. Vittal Prasad under their production banner, Arunachala Cine Creations, along with P. L. Thenappan as co-producer. Lalitha Mani was the choreographer for the song sequences. Jyothi Krishna, son of producer A. M. Rathnam, was involved in the development of the film's script.

Casting 

Rajinikanth was cast as the title character, a city-based engineer who returns to his ancestral village. Padayappa's cousin Neelambari is based on Nandini, a vengeful woman in Ponniyin Selvan. Meena and Nagma were earlier considered for the role, but Ramya Krishnan was ultimately cast. She said she accepted the role because "it was opposite a superstar and that too the character was a negative one, no one was ready to do it, but I did it. I didn't have any second thoughts." According to Aishwarya Rai, she was also considered for the role; however, Ravikumar denied the claim.

Simran was considered for the role of Vasundhara, before the role went to Soundarya, who had earlier worked with Rajinikanth in Arunachalam (1997). Ravikumar revealed that the makers could not sign Simran due to her busy schedule and Meena was also considered for Vasundhara's role. Shalini was touted to play the role of Padayappa's sister, but the role eventually went to Sithara.

The characterisation of the older Padayappa – bearded, with sunglasses – is based on Rajinikanth's look as the character Manik Baashha in Baashha (1995). Vijayakumar was the initial choice for Padayappa's father before Sivaji Ganesan was cast; Padayappa was his penultimate release before Pooparika Varugirom (1999). His character's appearance, with a mutton-chop moustache, is based on a similar role he played in Thevar Magan (1992).

Filming 

Principal photography began at the Raghavendra Kalyana Mandapam on 1 October 1998. The climax scene was one of the first to be shot, and was filmed in one take using two cameras. Around 2,000 extras were used for the scene. The car that was used in the scene which introduces Neelambari was a Toyota Sera, which belonged to Ravikumar. Ravikumar used the newly purchased car in the film at Rajinikanth's insistence. Filming also took place in Mysore. The Vadapalani-based shop, D. V. Nehru wigs, supplied the wigs that were sported by Ganesan. In a 2016 interview with The Hindu, Ravikumar mentioned that the scene where Padayappa uses his shawl to pull down a swing from the ceiling on which he sits after not being given a chair to sit by Neelambari, was inspired by a sequence in the Indian epic Ramayana, where Hanuman makes a seat using his tail after Ravana does not provide him a chair to sit.

"Kikku Yerudhey" was the last song sequence to be shot. For the sequence, Rajinikanth required Ravikumar to sport an outfit similar to Rajinikanth's, and enact a small part in the song. Rajinikanth also selected the part of the song where Ravikumar would make his appearance. After reluctantly agreeing to do the part, the sequence where they both appear together was filmed. Rajinikanth said he felt the shot did not look right, and re-takes for Ravikumar's sequence were done. After the re-takes were completed, Rajinikanth admitted that the first sequence was fine. When Ravikumar asked the cameraman why he had not told him earlier, the cameraman replied by saying that Rajinikanth wanted Ravikumar to do seven takes, to teach him a lesson for all the takes that Ravikumar had required of Rajinikanth.

Themes 
Writing for PopMatters, Ranjani Krishnakumar noted that Padayappa underlined Rajinikanth's political manoeuvres, evident when his character's lover sings "Kaadhal therdhalil kattil sinnathil vetri petru nee vaazgha" (In the election of love, with the symbol of bed, may you win and flourish). P. C. Balasubramanianram and N. Ramakrishnan, in their book, Grand Brand Rajini, said, "Padayappa, in one way, stands testimony to Rajini's life itself."

Music 

The film's soundtrack and background score were composed by A. R. Rahman, with lyrics by Vairamuthu. The soundtrack was released through Star Music. Strips of herbal rejuvenator capsules were sold along with the film's music cassettes. Before the film's release, Rahman asked Ravikumar if the soundtrack could be released in August 1999. Ravikumar informed Rahman that he had already discussed a release date with the press, and that Rahman would be blamed for any delay. To make the deadline, Rahman did a live re-recording of both the soundtrack and score to finish them on time.

The credits for the song "Vetri Kodi Kattu", sung by Palakkad Sreeram, initially went to Malaysia Vasudevan, who publicly stated that the credits for the song should have been attributed to Sreeram. Rahman requested the company who manufactured the audio cassettes to make the change. The song "Minsara Kanna" is based on the Vasantha raga, while "Vetri Kodi Kattu" is based on the Keeravani raga. "Minsara Kanna" established Srinivas as a leading singer in the film industry.

Srikanth Srinivasa of the Deccan Herald wrote, "The music by [Rahman], to Vairamuthu's lyrics, sounds good while the movie is on, though whether without the presence of [Rajinikanth] they would have, is another thing." S. Shiva Kumar of The Times of India was more critical of the soundtrack, and called it "lacklustre".

Release 
Padayappa was released theatrically on 10 April 1999 on the eve of Tamil New Year's Day. It was the first Tamil film to be released worldwide with over 200 prints, and 700,000 audio cassettes. The film's rights in Japan were sold for US$50,000, which was the highest an Indian film fetched for commercial release in 1999. Co-producer Thenappan registered the film posters as a Class 34 trademark in 1998, to be used for trademarking such items as beedis, cigarettes, cheroots and tobacco, making it the first instance of brand extension in the Tamil film industry.

Reception

Critical response 

Ananda Vikatan, in its original review of the film dated 25 April 1999, wrote that the original stamp of Rajinikanth style could be seen in the film several times, adding that Ramya Krishnan had matched Rajinikanth and created a royal path separately, and concluded that the film was exclusively made for Rajinikanth's fans, giving it a rating of 41 out of 100. Srikanth Srinivasa of Deccan Herald gave the film a positive verdict, claiming that the "positive energy generated by this film is simply astounding", and labelling Rajinikanth's role as "terrific". Ganesh Nadar of Rediff also gave a positive review, praising Ramya Krishnan's performance in the film, and said that she "does a fantastic job", concluding, "... if you are a Rajni fan, this film is vintage stuff."

S. Shiva Kumar of The Times of India was critical of the film's allusions to the actor's political career, stating that the film was "more style than substance". Sify praised Ramya Krishnan's performance but criticised Rajinikanth, stating that he had nothing to do but "be the Superman and spew dialogues". The reviewer concluded, "Technically the film has nothing much to offer." K. P. S. of Kalki called the screenplay confusing and dragged, and the film has too many sub plots within short time but praised the performances of Rajinikanth and Ramya Krishnan.

Box office 
Padayappa was a major box office success; according to The Tribune, it was the highest grossing Tamil film at that point. The film had a theatrical run of 100 days in 86 theatre centres, and was dubbed into Telugu under the title Narasimha. The dubbed version was also a commercially successful venture, and had a theatrical run of 50 days in 49 theatres.

Criticism from animal rights activists 
Nikhil Talreja, an animal activist, criticised one scene from the film which shows a bull charging at Vasundhara who is wearing a red sari. He accused the filmmakers of propagating the regressive myth that bulls charge at anything coloured red; the creatures are actually red–green color blind. Talreja also criticised another scene propagating a similarly regressive myth, that snakes drink milk. He said, "Snakes are not mammals. They are reptiles [...] For snakes, this is biologically impossible. Snakes in general can open three times the actual size of their mouth and consume prey directly. They just don't drink milk."

Accolades

Cancelled sequel 
Padayappa final cut initially lasted for 19 reels, which was considered too lengthy. Rather than cut the film, Rajinikanth suggested to Ravikumar to allot two intervals. He screened the uncut film for actor Kamal Haasan, who told him not to go for two intervals. Haasan suggested Padayappa be edited in a way that would not disturb the storyline, so Ravikumar and the editor Thanigachalam managed to bring the film down to 14 reels. When Kumudam reporter Kannan learnt about the scenes which had been cut, he asked Rajinikanth to release them as Padayappa sequel. Rajinikanth immediately spoke to Ravikumar about the possibility, but was informed that those reels had been destroyed.

Legacy 
With the success of Padayappa, Ramya Krishnan, who up to that point in time had only performed glamorous roles, showed her versatility as an actress. The character Neelambari reappears in Baba (2002), where she spots Baba (Rajinikanth) but sees him in her mind's eye in his Padayappa attire; she asks him the time. Her brother drags her away, and berates her for still not overcoming Padayappa. Ramya Krishnan and Nasser reprised their roles in this film. The success of Padayappa led to a film being named after one of its songs, Minsara Kanna (1999), also directed by Ravikumar where actress Khushbu appears in a negative role similar to Ramya Krishnan's in Padayappa; another song from the film, Vetri Kodi Kattu, became the name of a 2000 film directed by Cheran.

Ramya Krishnan played the role of Malini in the film Arumugam (2009), in which her character was similar to Neelambari. Her character in the television serial, Kalasam, was also named Neelambari. Actress Priyamani, in an interview with Prathibha Joy of The Times of India, stated her character in the Kannada film Ambareesha (2014), is similar to Neelambari. In Chetan Bhagat's novel, 2 States: The Story of My Marriage (2009), when Krish Malhotra, the protagonist, travels to Nungambakkam by auto rickshaw, the driver stops to worship a poster of Padayappa. The famous line in the film, "Idhu Anbala Serntha Koottam" (This crowd was formed out of love) was used in "The Punch Song", a song from the film, Aaha Kalyanam (2014).

Some of the quotes from the film that became popular were: "En Vazhi Thani Vazhi." (My way is a unique way); "Poda Aandavane Nammapakkam Irukan’’ (God is on our side); "Adhigama Aasaipadra Aambalaiyum, Adhigama Kobapadra Pombalaiyum, Nalla Vazhndhadha Sarithirame Kidaiyathu" (There is no history of a man who desires too much or a woman who gets too angry living well), "Kashtapadama Edhuvum Kidaikkathu. Kashtapadama Kidaikirathu Ennikkum Nilakkathu" (One can gain nothing without working hard for it. That which is gained without hard work will not last forever); the English dialogue "Anger is the cause of all miseries. One should know how to control it, otherwise life will become miserable", and Neelambari's dialogue "Vayasanalum un style um azhagum inum unna vitu pogala" (Even though you have grown older, your style and beauty has not left you). One of Rajinikanth's dialogues  "En Vazhi Thani Vazhi"  was used as the title of a 2015 film directed by Shaji Kailas. It was also used as the title of a 2010 book on branding by Sridhar Ramanujam.

Scenes and dialogues from the film were parodied in various other films such as Thirupathi Ezhumalai Venkatesa (1999), En Purushan Kuzhandhai Maadhiri (2001), Annai Kaligambal (2003), Sivaji (2007). Vel (2007), Siva Manasula Sakthi (2009), Malai Malai (2009), Vanakkam Chennai (2013), All in All Azhagu Raja (2013) and Anbanavan Asaradhavan Adangadhavan (2017). Padayappa was also parodied in the Star Vijay comedy series Lollu Sabha, in an episode appropriately named Vadayappa.

To celebrate the 39th anniversary of Rajinikanth in the film industry, Digitally Inspired Media, a Chennai-based digital agency, made 39 posters of some of his films, in which Padayappa was included. The posters feature one "punch" line from the film, a representative image, and the year of the film's release. On Rajinikanth's 64th birthday, an agency named Minimal Kollywood Posters designed posters of Rajinikanth's films, in which the Minion characters from the Despicable Me franchise are dressed as Rajinikanth. The digital art was hand drawn on a digital pad by Gautham Raj. One of the posters depicted a minion sitting on a swing and dressed like Rajinikanth's character in Padayappa, reminiscent of the swing scene. In the 2022 film Naai Sekar, many of the animal characters are named after Rajinikanth films, including a labrador dog named Padayappa.

References

Bibliography

External links 
 
 

1990s masala films
1990s Tamil-language films
1999 films
Films about families
Films directed by K. S. Ravikumar
Films scored by A. R. Rahman
Indian films about revenge